John Antonio Abraham (born May 6, 1978) is a former American football defensive end and outside linebacker who played 15 seasons in the National Football League (NFL). He played college football at South Carolina, and was drafted by the New York Jets in the first round of the 2000 NFL Draft. Abraham also played for the Atlanta Falcons and Arizona Cardinals.

Early years
Abraham was born in Timmonsville, South Carolina. In his high school years at Lamar High School in Lamar, South Carolina, he was primarily an athlete in the track program, where he set the current South Carolina record for the 200-meter dash, at 22.6 seconds, and ran the 100 meters in 11.26 seconds. He also competed in the throwing events, recording top-throws of 13.61 meters in the shot put and 43.05 meters in the discus. He played organized football for the first time as a senior in high school.

College career
While Abraham played just one season of high school football, he was nonetheless recruited to play for coach Brad Scott's South Carolina Gamecocks football team at the University of South Carolina. While he was a Gamecock, he amassed 23.5 quarterback sacks, ranking second on South Carolina's career list, and was a first-team All-Southeastern Conference (SEC) selection.

Professional career

New York Jets
Drafted in the first round (13th overall, via pick acquired from the Tampa Bay Buccaneers in exchange for Keyshawn Johnson) of the 2000 NFL Draft, he made an immediate impact for the New York Jets; in his rookie season, he recorded 12 tackles and 4.5 sacks in only six games before being injured. In 2001, he recorded 58 tackles and 13 sacks, and was named to the AFC Pro Bowl. In 2002, he recorded 48 tackles, with 10 sacks, and was again named to the Pro Bowl. In 2003, he only recorded 37 tackles and six sacks, due to being injured mid-season.

Abraham tied a franchise record set by Joe Klecko and Mark Gastineau with four sacks in a game on November 4, 2001 against the New Orleans Saints.

Abraham was designated Franchise Player by the Jets on February 21, 2006.

Atlanta Falcons
Abraham was traded to the Atlanta Falcons in exchange for Atlanta's 2006 NFL Draft first round pick (No. 29), which was acquired from Denver Broncos.

In 2008, he had a career high 16.5 sacks through the entire season and ranked 3rd in the league that year. Despite the great numbers he was not elected by voters to play in the 2009 Pro Bowl.

On December 12, 2010, Abraham recorded two sacks against the Carolina Panthers. The two sacks gave him 100.5 for his career, making him only the 25th player in NFL history to eclipse 100. On December 27, on Monday Night Football against the New Orleans Saints, Abraham recorded his first career interception after deflecting and catching a Drew Brees pass attempt.

In December 2010, Abraham was selected to his fourth Pro Bowl.

On June 21, 2012, Abraham signed a 3-year $16.72 million contract to remain in Atlanta.

On March 1, 2013, Abraham was released by the Atlanta Falcons.

Arizona Cardinals
Abraham signed with the Arizona Cardinals on July 25, 2013. In his first season in Arizona, he recorded 11.5 sacks, which ranked seventh in the NFL, and 4 forced fumbles. After a productive first season with the Cardinals, Abraham left Arizona’s week one Monday Night Football game on September 10, 2014, after a concussion. After the game, he spoke with Bruce Arians for several hours discussing if he should retire. On September 19, 2014, Abraham's 2014 season prematurely ended as the Cardinals placed him on injured reserve, effectively ending his career.

NFL career statistics

Personal life
Abraham was raised by his mother, Maggie Abraham. Abraham has a daughter, Endraya. He enjoys watching basketball in his spare time and his favorite team is the Los Angeles Lakers. He cites running back Walter Payton and wide receiver Jerry Rice as his childhood heroes. He attended the Jets' May 5, 2003 blood drive to benefit hospitals throughout Queens, Nassau and Suffolk counties.

References

External links
 Atlanta Falcons bio

1978 births
Living people
100 Sacks Club
American Conference Pro Bowl players
American football defensive ends
American football linebackers
Arizona Cardinals players
Atlanta Falcons players
National Conference Pro Bowl players
New York Jets players
People from Lamar, South Carolina
People from Timmonsville, South Carolina
Players of American football from South Carolina
South Carolina Gamecocks football players
Sportspeople from Florence, South Carolina
Unconferenced Pro Bowl players